Kendra Flock (born September 5, 1985) is a former Canadian soccer player who last played as a forward for Falköpings KIK at the Swedish Elitettan.

Life and career
Flock was born in Calgary, Alberta, and started playing soccer at the age of five at the Calgary Elbow Park. She played one season for the University of Central Florida where she started in all the team's season matches and led them in points.

In 2010, she played for the Vancouver Whitecaps and moved to the Victoria Highlanders in 2011.

Professionally, Flock played for Falköpings KIK in Sweden where she scored 4 goals in 7 matches.

Internationally, Flock represented Canada at the 2010 Cyprus Women's Cup where she played two matches and scored one goal.

References

External links
 
 Flock Profile at the University of Central Florida
 

1985 births
Living people
Canada women's international soccer players
Canadian women's soccer players
Women's association football forwards
University of Central Florida alumni
UCF Knights women's soccer players
Soccer players from Calgary